Huni Valley Senior High School is a coeducational second-cycle institution in Huni Valley in the Western Region of Ghana.

History
The school was established in November 1975. It is located in the Bogoso-Prestea district in the Western Region. The school was established to serve residents in the community and its nearby towns whose main occupation is farming and mining.

The school is located in the Bosomtwi Traditional Area. It has been a developing partner of the school. The Bosomtwi Traditional Authority did assist the school by providing land for its present location. The Traditional Authority also provides accommodation to the staff of the school.

The school runs five major programs mainly Business, General Arts, General Science, General Agriculture and Home Economics. The school runs both day and boarding system with boarding facilities for students from far communities. Students sit for the West African Senior Secondary Certificate Examination (WASSCE), an external exams that gets you admission into any tertiary institutions of your choice after Senior High School. The school colors are white and blue.

The Past students of the school are referred to as Gyeatuo a word in the Akan language which means to take bullet, in a contextual sense meaning to be Brave.

Facilities 
The school currently has nineteen (19) classroom blocks with a six (6) unit classroom block, sponsored by their P.T.A. There is also a twelve (12) unit classroom block sponsored by GetFund.
The school has four (4) laboratories that is Physics, Chemistry, Biology to aid with science projects and activities and Computer lab for I.C.T related activities.

Apart from these there are on-going projects which include a boys dormitory, a girls dormitory, also sponsored by GETFund

For Sporting activities, the school has a standard field for soccer and athletics as well as a volleyball court.

Major achievements 
SSCE: In 2005 the school had 100% pass in the Senior Secondary School Examinations.

WASSCE: In 2006 it achieved a pass 97% after the exams and in 2011, 100% by its students.

Co-curricula activities 
The school has the following clubs and religious groups

i.             Geography club

ii.            Cadet Corp

iii.           Civic club

iv.           School Choir

v.            Religious groups; GHAMSU/Scripture Union (SU), PENSA etc.

See also
 Education in Ghana
 List of senior high schools in Ghana

References

1975 establishments in Ghana
Educational institutions established in 1975
High schools in Ghana
Education in the Western Region (Ghana)